Brian Francis Riley (14 September 1937 – 19 October 2017) was an English professional footballer who played as a left winger.

Career
Born in Bolton, Riley played for Bolton Wanderers, Weymouth, and Buxton. After retiring as a player due to injury he worked as an electrician.

Personal life
Riley had three children and six grandchildren.

References

1937 births
2017 deaths
English footballers
Bolton Wanderers F.C. players
Weymouth F.C. players
Buxton F.C. players
English Football League players
Association football wingers
Footballers from Bolton